Mariana Dimitrova Gurkova-Franco is a Bulgarian pianist, born in Sofia. Gurkova, who nowadays is a naturalised Spanish citizen, settled in Madrid in 1988. A former head professor at Badajoz's Conservatory, she is a teacher at Madrid's Real Conservatorio Superior.

References 
 Review of a performance of Vladiguerov's 3rd Piano Concerto - El País, May 3, 1999
 Profile at the Fundación Juan March

External links 
 Personal webpage

Living people
Musicians from Sofia
Bulgarian classical pianists
Spanish women pianists
Bulgarian expatriates in Spain
Spanish classical pianists
Spanish people of Bulgarian descent
Academic staff of the Madrid Royal Conservatory
José Iturbi International Piano Competition prize-winners
International Ettore Pozzoli Piano Competition prize-winners
21st-century classical pianists
Year of birth missing (living people)
21st-century women pianists